Elizabeth of Poland (1305 – 29 December 1380) was Queen of Hungary by marriage to Charles I of Hungary, and regent of Poland from 1370 to 1376 during the reign of her son Louis I.

Life

Early life
She was a member of the Polish royal House of Piast, the daughter of Władysław I the Elbow-high, prince of Kujavia, later King of Poland, and Jadwiga of Greater Poland. She was the sister of Casimir III of Poland, who died in 1370. Her older sister was Cunigunde of Poland, who was married to Bernard of Świdnica.

Queen consort

She was married on 6 July 1320 to Charles I Robert, King of Hungary. Elizabeth was Charles' fourth wife. The marriage brought an alliance between Poland and Hungary.

Charles' two previous marriages are believed not to have left surviving issue, at least no surviving sons. Charles' first wife Maria of Bytom was believed to have been barren but it is also believed she bore two daughters: Catherine and Elizabeth. Others however believe that the two girls were daughters of Queen Elizabeth.

While at court in Hungary, Elizabeth is credited as having been the first to introduce perfume, then known as Hungary Water, to Europe and the western world.

Queen mother
Following her husband Charles Robert's death, Elizabeth wished to make a good marriage for her eldest surviving son, Louis. She had her son betrothed to Margaret of Bohemia, daughter of Charles IV, Holy Roman Emperor. They married in 1342 but the marriage didn't last because, seven years into the marriage, the fourteen-year-old Margaret died, childless. Elizabeth now needed for her son to remarry and produce an heir.

The branch of the Kuyavian Piast family was popular in Hungary, and several members lived in Louis' court. Elizabeth's influence extended far beyond any other queen consort, and years before, Stephen II, Ban of Bosnia, married Elizabeth of Kuyavia, the daughter of the Duke Kazimierz III of Gniewkowo, Queen Elizabeth's cousin. Stephen II of Bosnia had a young daughter named Elizabeth, and after learning about her, the Hungarian queen insisted immediately on bringing her to the Hungarian court for fostering. Stephen was reluctant at first, but eventually dispatched Elizabeth. Three years later, Queen Elizabeth invited Stephen to Hungary and arranged a marriage between their children.

The queen mother was heir to her brother Casimir's throne after the death of their sister, Cunigunde. Her claim passed to Louis after the death of his two elder brothers. Casimir had married four times but none of his wives had given him surviving sons. He chose to leave Louis the crown of Poland thus Hungary and Poland being united under one monarch.

Elizabeth's second surviving son, Andrew, married Joan I of Naples. Andrew wished to be made king of Naples and rule jointly with his wife, but Joan refused. Pope Clement VI approved Joan's request to be crowned alone. Fearing for his life, Andrew wrote to his mother that he would soon flee the kingdom. She intervened and made a state visit; before she returned to Hungary, she bribed the Pope to reverse himself and permit Andrew's coronation. She also gave her son a ring, which was supposed to protect him from death by blade or poison, and returned with a false sense of security to Hungary. The ring didn't protect him; Andrew was soon assassinated by strangulation.

Regent
Louis was absent from Poland between 1370 and 1375. Elizabeth was made regent to conveniently eliminate her from his court. The Poles hated paying taxes and loved to quarrel among themselves and with the court, especially with the domineering Elizabeth. Her regency turned out to be a failure, her own Polish background notwithstanding. In 1376, the Poles killed 160 of her Hungarian bodyguards and Elizabeth escaped to Hungary lest she, too, be killed by her compatriots. Louis reconciled with the rebels, and strengthened his power, at his mother's expense.

Death
After her regency and her return to Hungary, Elizabeth spent her final years in a monastery outside of Buda, where she wrote her will. It specifies her desire to rest in the monastery of Order of Saint Clare in Old Buda. Elizabeth also left money and possessions to her family: she left Louis several golden vessels, daughter-in-law, Elizabeth of Bosnia - Buda Castle, granddaughter, Mary - a gold wreath, granddaughter, Jadwiga - wreath of lilies, and her niece, Hedwig - a ring. She also left money to some churches.

Issue
 Charles (1321)
 Ladislaus (Belgrade, 1 November 1324 – 24 February 1329)
 Louis I of Hungary (1326–1382)
 Andrew, Duke of Calabria (1327–1345)
 Stephen, Duke of Slavonia (1332–1354)
 Catherine (d. 1355)
 Elizabeth (d.1367), married Boleslaw Opolski, sister of Katherine and also possible daughter of Elisabeth of Poland.

Ancestors

Legacy 

The Queen was a renowned patron of arts and founder of many shrines which she fitted with wonderful treasures. The exquisite examples of Queen's foundation includes silver Reliquary Shrine with Virgin and Child from about 1350 in the Metropolitan Museum of Art, attributed to Jean de Touyl, most probably created for the convent of the Poor Clares of the Order of Saint Francis at Buda, also founded by the Queen in 1334 and silver reliquary of Saint Nicholas in the form of a gothic church from 1344, attributed to Pietro di Simone Gallico in the Museo Nicolaiano in Bari. Elizabeth also inspired the foundation of the Hungarian Chapel in Aachen and sponsored some of its treasures.

In popular culture

Film 
Queen Elizabeth is one of the supporting characters in Polish historical drama TV series "Korona królów" ("The Crown of the Kings"). She is played by Katarzyna Czapla.

See also
 Hungary Water

Notes

References

|-

|-

Piast dynasty
Regents of Poland
14th-century women rulers
Hungarian queens consort
Polish princesses
Hungarian people of Polish descent
1305 births
1380 deaths
14th-century Hungarian people
14th-century Hungarian women
14th-century Polish people
14th-century Polish women
Daughters of kings
Queen mothers